Gonzalo Justiniano (born 1955) is a Chilean filmmaker.

Select filmography
 Guerreros pacifistas (1984)
 La Victoria (1984)
 Hijos de la guerra fría (1986)
 Sussi (1988)
 Caluga o menta (1990)
 Amnesia (1994)
 Pasión gitana (1997)
 Tuve un sueño contigo (1999)
 El Leyton (2002)
 B-Happy (2003)
 Lokas (2008)
 ¿Alguien ha visto a Lupita? (2011)
 Cabros de mierda (2017)

References

External links

Living people
1955 births
Chilean film directors